The 1st Ranger Company may refer to:

1st Ranger Company (New Zealand)
1st Ranger Infantry Company (United States)